Konstantin "Kosta" Mandrović (1873–1903) was a Serbian illustrator, author and publisher in Vienna, Austria.

He was an ethnic Serb who lived in Vienna. He was an experienced book trader before he started publishing the illustrated magazine of "Srpska zora" (1876-1881).

Work

References

Sources

Serbian illustrators
Serbian writers
Serbian publishers (people)
Businesspeople from Vienna
Austrian people of Serbian descent
19th-century Serbian people
20th-century Serbian people
Date of birth missing
1903 deaths